The 2016 UEC European Track Championships is the seventh edition of the elite UEC European Track Championships in track cycling and will take place at the Velodrome de Saint-Quentin-en-Yvelines in Saint-Quentin-en-Yvelines, France, between 19 and 23 October. The Event was organised by the European Cycling Union. All European champions are awarded the UEC European Champion jersey which may be worn by the champion throughout the year when competing in the same event at other competitions.

The 10 Olympic events (sprint, team sprint, team pursuit, keirin and omnium for men and women), as well as 12 other events are on the program for these European Championships. For the first time ever, madison will be in the program for women.

Schedule
Schedule only indicating the finals.

Events

Notes 
 Competitors named in italics only participated in rounds prior to the final.
 These events are not contested in the Olympics.
 In the Olympics, these events are contested within the omnium only.

Medal table

External links
 Official documents

 
2016 in track cycling
European Track Championships
2016 UEC
International cycle races hosted by France
Saint-Quentin-en-Yvelines
October 2016 sports events in Europe